27861  is the sixth studio album from American country music ensemble Parmalee. It was released on July 21, 2017.

Background

Parmalee had first released the lead single from the album, "Roots", on April 11, 2016, however it only reached No. 35 on Country Airplay. The lead singer of Parmalee Matt Thomas then started to co-write a number of new songs with other songwriters, such as Craig Wiseman, Jim Beavers, Josh Osborne, busbee, and Tom Douglas. The group also decided to co-produce these new tracks through their own initiative with other producers, primarily Tommy Cecil and Brock Berryhill. One of these new songs, "Sunday Morning", was released to radio as the second single on May 1, 2017. The songs from the album were recorded in five different locations, including Pegram Palace, where the Thomas brothers live.

The number 27861 is the postal code of Parmele, the hometown of the group. Each of the four bandmembers has a tattoo of those digits. Matt Thomas said: "We've had that album title for a while; we've really been wanting to use it. We just felt like now was the time to use it".

Commercial performance
The album debuted at No. 22 on the Billboard's Top Country Albums chart, selling 3,800 copies in the first week. As of September 2017, it has sold 7,300 copies in the United States.

Track listing

Personnel 
 Barry Knox - bass guitar, backing vocals
 Josh McSwain - electric guitar, keyboards, backing vocals
 Matt Thomas - acoustic guitar, electric guitar, lead vocals
 Scott Thomas - drums, percussion
 Josh Osborne – backing vocals

Charts

Singles

Music videos

References

2017 albums
Parmalee albums
BBR Music Group albums